Kadnikovo is a rural locality (a selo) and the administrative center of Kadnikovsky Selsoviet, Mamontovsky District, Altai Krai, Russia. The population was 801 as of 2013. There are 9 streets.

Geography 
Kadnikovo is located 30 km northeast of Mamontovo (the district's administrative centre) by road. Bukanskoye is the nearest rural locality.

References 

Rural localities in Mamontovsky District